HMS Philomel was an eight-gun Alert-class packet brig of the Royal Navy, built between 1840 and 1842.  Ships of this class were designed by William Symonds in 1834, and the Philomel was built at Plymouth.

The vessel launched in 1842 as a surveying vessel, and by 1857 was given over to the coastguard and renamed CGWV.23.

It foundered in the Swale in 1869, and the wreck was sold to Hayhurst & Clasper as salvage.  It was finally broken up on 26 February 1870.

The Falkland Islands issued a set of stamps in 1985 for "Early Cartographers maps", the ship is featured on the fourth in set, 54p stamp along with Admiral Sir B. J. Sulivan K.C.B.

References

 

1842 ships
Ships built in Plymouth, Devon